The Fountain of Sultan Ahmed III is a fountain in a Turkish rococo structure in the great square in front of the Imperial Gate of Topkapı Palace in Istanbul, Turkey. It was built under Ottoman sultan Ahmed III in 1728, in the style of the Tulip period. It was a social centre and gathering place during the Ottoman period of Constantinople.

History

The fountain kiosk of Ahmed III is in the place of a Byzantine fountain known as Perayton. Another fountain, built during the Byzantine Empire stood on the site before this fountain. The architectural features of the exterior reflect a synthesis of traditional Ottoman and contemporary western styles.

The fountain was depicted on the reverse of the Turkish 10 lira banknotes of 1947-1952.

Architecture

The fountain is a large square block built with five small domes. Mihrab-shaped niches decorated in low relief with foliate and floral designs in each of the four façades, each containing a drinking fountain (çeşme). The water is supplied from an octagonal pool inside the kiosk, with circulation space around it for kiosk attendants. On each corner is a triple-grilled sebil (from which an attendant issued cups of water or sherbet, free of charge, from behind a grille).

Above the drinking fountains and niches on each façade and sebil are large calligraphic plates bordered with blue and red tiles. Each plate bears stanzas of a 14-line poem dedicated to water and its donor by Seyyid Hüseyin Vehbi bin Ahmed, the chief judge of Halep and Kayseri. It is read clockwise around the fountain, beginning at the northern sebil. The last stanza of the poem the northwest façade is a chronogram composed by Ahmed III.

Literature 
 Dünden Bugüne Istanbul Ansiklopedisi (1993) Istanbul, Türkiye Ekonomik ve Toplumsal Tarih Vakfı I, 116-117. 
 Aynur, Hatice and Hakan T. Karateke (1995) III. Ahmed devri Istanbul çesmeleri, 1703-1730. Istanbul, Istanbul Büyükşehir Belediyesi Kültür İşleri Daire Başkanlığı. 
 Egemen, Affan (1993) Istanbul'un çesme ve sebilleri: resimleri ve kitabeleri ile 1165 çesme ve sebil. Istanbul, Aritan Yayinevi. 
 Kara Pilehvarian, Nuran (2000) Fountains in Ottoman Istanbul. Istanbul, Yapi-Endüstri Merkezi Yayinlari. 
 Şerifoğlu, Ömer Faruk (1995) Su güzeli: Istanbul sebilleri. Istanbul, Istanbul Büyükşehir Belediyesi Kültür İşleri Daire Başkanlığı.

Notes and references

External links 
 Archnet.org | Fountain of Ahmed III

Infrastructure completed in 1728
Fountains in Istanbul
Pavilions
Ottoman architecture in Istanbul
Rococo architecture in Turkey
Fatih
1728 establishments in the Ottoman Empire